Olympias Frenarou is a volleyball team based in Frenaros, Famagusta District, Cyprus. Previously, Olympiaw had also a football team playing in Cypriot Fourth Division for 8 seasons. In 2000 the football team merged with Fotiakos Frenarou to form Frenaros FC 2000.

Honours

Volleyball
Men
Cyprus Volleyball Division 2:
Winner (2): 2007/08, 2010/11
Cypriot Men's Volleyball Cup D2:
Winner (3): 2010/11, 2014/15, 2015/16

References

Volleyball clubs in Cyprus
1940 establishments in Cyprus
Defunct football clubs in Cyprus